The Lord Howe Seamount Chain formed during the Miocene. It features many coral-capped guyots and is one of the two parallel seamount chains alongside the east coast of Australia; the Lord Howe and Tasmantid seamount chains both run north-south through parts of the Coral Sea and Tasman Sea. These chains have longitudes of approximately 159°E and 156°E respectively.

Geography 
The Lord Howe Seamount Chain has been known under a variety of different gazetted names, including the Lord Howe Seamounts, Lord Howe Guyots, Lord Howe Rise Guyots and the Middleton Chain.

The Lord Howe Seamount Chain is on the western slope of Lord Howe Rise, a deep-sea elevated plateau which is a submerged part of Zealandia. The Tasmantid and Lord Howe seamount chains are both broadly within the Tasman basin (the abyssal plain between Lord Howe Rise and the Australian continental shelf), and lie on opposite sides of Dampier Ridge (a submerged continental fragment).

The Lord Howe Seamount Chain extends from the Chesterfield group (20°S) to Flinders Seamount (34.7°S). It includes Nova Bank, Argo and Kelso seamounts, Capel and Gifford guyots, Middleton and Elizabeth reefs, Lord Howe Island and Ball's Pyramid.

Geology
The Lord Howe and Tasmantid chains each resulted from the Indo-Australian Plate moving northward over a stationary hotspot; historically the hotspot for the Lord Howe chain was expected to presently be beneath Flinders Seamount. but is now thought likely to be somewhat to the south of this, possibly beyond the Heemskerck and Zeehaen seamounts. Indeed the dating of this chain has only been as far south as Lord Howe Island which erupted 6.5 million years ago. The chain has been characterised back to 28 million years but may be older. On the Australian mainland, a third north-south sequence of extinct volcanoes (which includes the Glass House Mountains) is likely to have the same origin.

See also
 Lord Howe Marine Park
Gifford Marine Park

References 

Seamount chains
Guyots
Hotspot tracks
Volcanoes of Zealandia
Seamounts of the Pacific Ocean
Seamounts of the Tasman Sea